Pellinger Berg Tunnel is a 596-metre road tunnel in Saarland, Germany. It lies along Bundesautobahn 8.

Buildings and structures in Saarland
Road tunnels in Germany